MBDA is a European multinational developer and manufacturer of missiles. It was created in December 2001 after the merger of the main French, British and Italian missile systems companies. They were the missile businesses of Aérospatiale-Matra (merged into EADS, now called Airbus), BAE Systems and Finmeccanica (now Leonardo). "MBDA" is an initialism of the names of said missile businesses: Matra, BAe Dynamics and Alenia. The company's headquarters are located in Le Plessis-Robinson, France. 

Despite being a European joint venture, MBDA has maintained national divisions since its creation: MBDA France, MBDA UK and MBDA Italy. They were formed by simply grouping in their respective countries the assets and activities of the various French, British and Italian businesses that had merged to create MBDA.

In March 2006, LFK-Lenkflugkörpersysteme GmbH, the German missile subsidiary of EADS, was acquired by MBDA and Spanish assets followed in 2010, leading to the formation of two additional national divisions (MBDA Germany and MBDA Spain).

In 2016, the company had more than 10,500 employees. In 2017, MBDA recorded orders for €4.2 bn and an order book of €16.8 bn. MBDA works with over 90 armed forces worldwide and also has a number of subsidiaries, including one in the United States (MBDA Inc).

History 

The consolidation of Europe's missile companies began in 1996 when parts of Matra Defence and BAe Dynamics merged their missile activities to form Matra BAe Dynamics (MBD). Matra BAe Dynamics represented half of Matra Hautes Technologies' missile business; the other half was Matra Missiles which became Aérospatiale-Matra Missiles (AMM). In 1999, Matra group merged with Aérospatiale. In 2000, Aérospatiale-Matra became part of EADS (now Airbus).

In 1998, GEC-Marconi Radar and Defence Systems and Alenia Difesa combined their missile and radar activities to form Alenia Marconi Systems (AMS). In 1999, British Aerospace purchased GEC's defence business to form BAE Systems.

In December 2001, MBD (including AMM) and the Missile and Missile Systems activities of AMS merged, creating MBDA. In June 2005, LFK, a unit of Airbus Defence and Security Systems, agreed to be merged into MBDA. On 1 March 2006, LFK became MBDA Germany. ON 9 May 2012, the LFK-Lenkflugkörpersysteme GmbH became MBDA Deutschland GmbH. Since February 2002, MBDA has owned 40% of Inmize Sistemas S.L., a Spanish company that was formed to integrate the experience and technology of the major Spanish defence companies in the guided weapons sector. As AMS had R&D assets located in California, MBDA also managed to acquire development and production facilities in the United States, choosing to operate in the country as a wholly-owned subsidiary, called MBDA Inc. In December 2011, MBDA Inc acquired the Viper Strike activity of Northrop Grumman in Huntsville, Alabama.

In August 2022, MBDA Missile Systems' data was hacked from a compromised external hard drive. The data included blueprints of weapons used by NATO allies in the Ukraine conflict, and 80 GB of such data was sold for 15 Bitcoin. NATO started an investigation trying to assess and minimize the impact of this data breach.

Products
Overall, the group has 45 products in service and 15 more in development.
MBDA's products include:
 Air-to-air missiles:
 ASRAAM - short range, IR guided
 Meteor - long range, active radar terminal homing
 MICA - IR and radar guided versions (also SAM)
 Surface-to-air missiles:
 Aspide
 CAMM (air, land and naval versions)
 Eurosam Aster - medium (Aster 15) and long range (Aster 30) SAMs land and naval versions
 LFK NG (together with Diehl BGT Defence)
 Mistral (also AAM)
 Rapier
 Sea Wolf

 Air-to-surface missiles:
 Apache 
 AS-30L 
 ASMPA - French nuclear missile
Brimstone
 Diamond Back range extension kit  for the SDB 
 PGM 500 and PGM 2000 guided missiles
 Laser-Guided Zuni
Storm Shadow/SCALP-EG
 Viper Strike
 Anti-ship missiles:
 Exocet (air-, surface ship-, coastal battery- and submarine-launched versions)
 Marte (air-, surface ship- and coastal battery-launched versions)
 Otomat/Teseo
 Perseus (CVS401)
 Sea Eagle
 Sea Venom
 Anti-tank missiles:
 Enforcer - shoulder-launched guided rocket
 Eryx - short range
 HOT
 MILAN
 Missile Moyenne Portée (MMP)
 PARS 3 LR - long range (together with Diehl BGT Defence)
Systems
Eurosam SAMP/T
MEADS
Next Generation Multiple Warhead System
PAAMS missile system comprising:
Eurosam PAAMS(E)
UKAMS PAAMS(S)
Spada

Locations

France:
Le Plessis-Robinson (headquarters)
Bourges
Selles-Saint-Denis
Germany:
Schrobenhausen
Ulm
Aschau am Inn
Italy:
La Spezia
Rome
Fusaro
United Kingdom:
Filton, Bristol
Bolton, Greater Manchester
Stevenage, Hertfordshire
London, Greater London
United States:
 Westlake Village, California
 Washington, DC
 Huntsville, Alabama
India:
Coimbatore- L&T MBDA Missile Systems (A joint venture between Larsen & Toubro and MBDA).

References

External links
 MBDA website
 MBDA Presents Multiple Solutions For Modern Combat Missions : Meteor, Marte, MMP, Exocet on airrecognition.com

Aerospace companies
Aerospace companies of France
Aerospace companies of Germany
Aerospace companies of Italy
Aerospace companies of the United Kingdom
Defence companies of France
Defence companies of Germany
Defence companies of Italy
Defence companies of the United Kingdom
Guided missile manufacturers
BAE Systems joint ventures
Leonardo S.p.A.
Manufacturing companies established in 2001
Multinational joint-venture companies
Aerospace companies of Spain
Defence companies of Spain